Cantab was a magazine produced by students at the University of Cambridge for nearly a decade between 1981 and 1990. It was unusual among British student magazines in being completely independent of student unions. Cantab operations were self-financed, initially through copy sales and advertising, later through advertising alone. The magazine's name, Cantab, is derived from the Latin name for Cambridge and is also short for Cantabrigiensis, the post nominal suffix indicating a degree from the University of Cambridge.

The magazine was relaunched many times but it ultimately ended production in 1990 when its new free distribution model, introduced in 1985, proved to be no longer feasible.

History
The magazine was launched in 1981 by a group of students at the University of Cambridge who wanted to start a magazine which was completely independent and unaffiliated with the student union. By 1985, the Cambridge magazine continued to grow and had launched a spin-off summer title, Cantab's What's On and Where to Go in Cambridge, which gained success in that year's Student Media Awards, run by The Guardian newspaper. Other less successful spin-offs, including Business Matters and Cantab's version of Energy Matters, were produced occasionally as revenue generating vehicles to subsidize the main title.

The title's second claim to fame was its production via an extremely early form of desktop publishing, involving a typesetting program specially written for its BBC Micro computer and Juki daisy wheel printer by Martin Tod and introduced as early as the first months of 1984.

In 1985/6 the magazine was relaunched, switching from a paid-for circulation to free distribution. Relying solely on advertising sales was an unusual and potentially risky move, but allowed for a massively increased print run, increased pagination and higher production quality. While maintaining a focus on arts coverage, the magazine took an increased interest in politics and current affairs, with a noticeably more left-wing stance.

Legacy
The magazine was relaunched again in 1987/88 but ultimately ended production in 1990 when its business model proved to be no longer feasible. Cantab is often seen as a forerunner to The Tab, a modern-day, multi-national student paper which features students and campuses from across the UK, United States, and Canada.

Cantab alumni include:

 Paul Abrahams. Director of Corporate Communications for Reed Elsevier, London; triple Gold Medal winner in fencing in the veterans' category at the Commonwealth Games.
 Marina Benjamin. Journalist, editor, and professional gambler. Author of 'The Middlepause' (2016) and 'A Little Give' (2023).
 Grace Bradberry. Editor of T2 at The Times.
 Colin Brown. Longtime editor-in-Chief of Screen International, professor at the NYU Film School and contributing editor for CNBC.
 Roz Carroll. Noted body psychotherapist and lecturer. Author of 'Self-regulation: an evolving concept at the heart of body psychotherapy,' in Hartley, Contemporary Body Psychotherapy: The Chiron Approach (2009) 
 John Crowther. Strategy Director at the WCRS creative agency. Co-author New Models of Marketing Effectiveness: From Integration to Orchestration  (2011), writer on brand and marketing theory 
 Mike Dash. Fortean, publisher of Viz, featured contributor to Smithsonian and author of Batavia's Graveyard (2001).
 Paul-Michael Dempsey. Co-Founder and Editor-in-Chief of Tech Design Forum; Washington correspondent, Engineering & Technology magazine.
Jo Eccleshall. Partner, PriceWaterhouseCoopers.
 Paul Foulkes-Arellano. New Business & Marketing Director at the Seymourpowell branding agency.
 Francis Freisinger. Vice President of Latin American Economics at Merrill Lynch & Co.
 Richard Furlong. Defence barrister specialising in major fraud, money laundering and drugs cartel cases. Author of International Money Laundering and Terrorist Financing (2008).
 Midge Gillies. Journalist and biographer of Marie Lloyd and Amy Johnson. Tutor at the University of Cambridge's Institute of Continuing Education.
 Chris Grayling. Former British Secretary of State for Transport, Leader of the House of Commons and British Secretary of State for Justice. Current Conservative Member of Parliament for Epsom and Ewell. Contributor to Insight Guide Waterways of Europe.
 Tim Harper. Author and historian.
 Penny Harris. Editorial director of the Attic Futura and H.Bauer magazine publishing companies. Author of The Movers and Shakers of Victorian England (2005).
 Wendy Holden. Best-selling chick lit novelist and one-time ghostwriter for Tara Palmer-Tomkinson. Author of Azur Like It, Pastures Nouveaux, Fame Fatale, etc. etc. etc.
 Madeleine Holt. Newsnight culture correspondent, 1989–2010; founder of the Meet the Parents education initiative
 Paul Horrell. Eminent motoring journalist; contributor to Top Gear (magazine). "Been around a long time. If you drive a new car, he tested its predecessor’s predecessor’s predecessor."
 Sarah Howgate. Contemporary Curator, National Portrait Gallery; author of Lucian Freud Portraits (2012).
 Nicky Louth-Davies. Formerly change management mentor, House of Commons; now Group Director at Ecclesiastical Insurance Group.
 Andrew Lownie. Top literary agent and biographer of John Buchan and Guy Burgess.
 Robert Mason. Journalist.
 Ben Mingay. Leading corporate financier with Smith Square Partners.
 Caren Myers. Mafia prosecutor and New York assistant district attorney in the Organised Crime and Racketeering Section turned associate professor of law at Georgia State University. Author of The Drug Dealer, the Narc, and the Very Tiny Constable: Reflections on United States v. Jones (2012)
 David Owens. Professor of Philosophy at King's College London. Author of Shaping the Normative Landscape (2012).
 Richard Penty, FREng. Master of Sidney Sussex College and Professor of Photonics at the University of Cambridge. Author of 'Gigahertz-gated InGaAs/InP single-photon detector with detection efficiency exceeding 55% at 1550 nm.' (2015) and numerous similar papers.
 Jane Penrose. Educational consultant.
 Nicholas Pyke. Editor, Review section, Mail on Sunday.
 Jim Roberts. London-based maritime solicitor specialising in Franco-Arab cargo disputes.
 Stephen Sackur. Formerly  BBC News Channel correspondent in Washington, D.C. Presenter of HARDtalk and author of On the Basra Road (1991). International TV Personality of the Year, 2010.
 Alexander Shankland. Research fellow at the Institute of Development Studies at the University of Sussex.
 Ian Shuttleworth. Theatre critic for the Financial Times; editor and publisher of Theatre Record since 2004 and lead contributor to Reading the Vampire Slayer: An Unofficial Critical Companion to Buffy and Angel (2001).
 Simon Silvester. Leading advertising agency strategist and head of planning at a succession of major agencies until his death in September 2012.
 Louise Simpson. Formerly Director of Communications, University of Cambridge.
 Kevin G. Southernwood. Leader of Cambridge city council 1995–98; organiser, Penrith junior chess club, 2015.
 Caroline Thomson. Marketing director, The Link DSG.
 Martin Tod. Chief executive of the Men's Health Forum and formerly Liberal Democrats parliamentary candidate for Winchester .
 Gideon Todes. Award-winning advertising copywriter responsible for some of The Economists successful print advertising campaign. Brand consultant, trainer and creator of The Copy Course.
 Bob Tolliday. Formerly Principal Investigative Reporter, Which? magazine; Communications manager for the International Lead Association.
 Roger Tredre. Lecturer in fashion journalism at Central St Martins University of the Arts, and formerly editor-in-chief of Worth Global Style Network, the multimillion-pound design trends web site. Author of The Great Fashion Designers (2009).
 Cathy Troupp. Child and Adolescent Psychotherapist at Great Ormond Street Hospital for Children.
 Tim Turner. Magazine editor and novelist.
 Brian Watson. Cult industrial designer.
 Annabel Warburg.  Teacher at St Swithun's School; married to Sir Frederick Hervey-Bathurst, Bt.
 Tessa Watt. BBC Radio 3 producer, influential figure in the World music scene,  mindfulness consultant; author of Mindful London (2014); works at Westminster with the All-party Parliamentary Group for Mindfulness.
 Sarah Webbe. Chambers director at Fourteen, the specialist family law barristers
 Jo Whelan CBE. Comptroller General of the Commissioners for the Reduction of the National Debt.
 Marina Wheeler QC. Barrister specialising in European Union law and former wife of Boris Johnson, Prime Minister of the United Kingdom.
 Andy Wilton. Noted New Zealand-based games programmer. Formerly senior lead programmer with Gameloft New Zealand and technical director of Climax Studios, Auckland. Now leading a programme to build virtual actors and achieve digital immortality.

See also
Cherwell (Oxford)
The Tab (Cambridge)
Varsity (Cambridge)

References

Student magazines published in the United Kingdom
Defunct magazines published in the United Kingdom
Magazines established in 1981
Magazines disestablished in 1990
Publications associated with the University of Cambridge
Biweekly magazines published in the United Kingdom
Mass media in Cambridge